The Earl of Huntingdon's Regiment of Foot may refer to
 Theophilus Hastings, 7th Earl of Huntingdon's regiment, of which he was colonel 1685–1688, later 13th Regiment of Foot
 George Hastings, 8th Earl of Huntingdon's regiment, of which he was colonel 1702–1703, later 33rd Regiment of Foot